Lampert Distelmeyer, or Lamprecht Distelmeyer (22 February 1522, Leipzig - 12 October 1588, Berlin) was a German jurist and Chancellor of Mark Brandenburg.

Life 
His family was originally from Lüneburg, and received their Bürgerrechts for Leipzig in 1490. His father was a tailor. He originally studied theology at St. Thomas School but, on the advice of Philipp Melanchthon, switched to law in 1542.

Three years later, he was working as an advisor for Chancellor  in Merseburg. In 1546, he returned to Leipzig to complete his studies. He then became Syndic for the city of Bautzen and earned his doctorate from the law faculty of Leipzig University. In 1549, he married Elisabeth Goldhan, the daughter of a merchant. Their son , served as the Chancellor of Mark Brandenburg from 1588 to 1598.

In 1569, he helped secure the transfer of the Duchy of Prussia, from King Sigismund II Augustus of Poland to Albert Frederick of the Brandenburg Hohenzollerns. As a result, he was granted a Knighthood. He was also the Lord of Mahlsdorf (now part of Berlin).

In 1895, he was chosen to be one of the historical figures represented on the Siegesallee (Victory Avenue), a monument garden in Berlin. His marble bust was created by the sculptor, Martin Wolff, and was unveiled in 1901. It was damaged during World War II, as were most of the others, and is now in storage at the Spandau Citadel.

Further reading 
 
 Friedrich Holtze: "Lambert Distelmeier, kurbrandenburgischer Kanzler" In: Schriften des Vereins für die Geschichte Berlins. #32. 1895. pp. 1–97 (Online)

External links 
 Lampert Distelmeyer @ the Freie Universität Berlin
 Works by and about Lampert Distelmeyer @ WorldCat
 Works by and about Lamprecht Distelmeyer (page 1) (page 2) @ the Deutschen Digitalen Bibliothek

1522 births
1588 deaths
German jurists
Leipzig University alumni
Chancellors (government)
Academic staff of Leipzig University